Pedernales Electric Cooperative is a not-for-profit rural electric distribution, utility cooperative headquartered in Johnson City, Texas.  The cooperative was organized in 1938.

A 2.25-MW / 4.5-MWh (2-hour)  grid battery was installed in Johnson City in 2020.

Cooperative Leadership
Pedernales Electric Cooperative is led by Julie Caruthers Parsley, who joined the cooperative as chief executive officer in 2017. Previously, Parsley was a partner at the law firm Parsley Coffin Renner. Additionally, Parsley is a former Commissioner of the Public Utility Commission of Texas and focused her law practice on energy-related legal and consulting services in Texas and the Southwest. She is also a former Solicitor General of Texas, is board certified in civil appellate law and was an adjunct professor of law teaching appellate practice and procedure at the University of Texas School of Law.

Board of Directors
As a cooperative, PEC is owned and governed by the members it serves, and members are democratically elected to serve on the cooperative's board of directors. In 2016, the cooperative adopted a single-member district voting methodology in which members vote every three years for their district's director seat.

References

External links
Pedernales Electric Cooperative

Electric cooperatives in Texas
Texas Hill Country
Companies based in Texas
1938 establishments in Texas
American companies established in 1938
Energy companies established in 1938